Julia Twardowska  (born 4 May 1995 in Środa Wielkopolska) is a Polish volleyball player. She is part of the Poland women's national volleyball team.

She participated in the 2018 Montreux Volley Masters, and 2018 FIVB Volleyball Women's Nations League.
At the club level she played for Budowlani Łódź in 2018.

References

External links 

 FIB profile
 CEV profile

1995 births
Living people
Polish women's volleyball players
People from Środa Wielkopolska